Ruth Vega Fernandez (née Ruth Fernández Martín; born 12 April 1977 on Canary Islands) is a Spanish-Swedish actress. She is known for her roles in Call Girl and Gentlemen.

She has studied at Balettakademien.

Filmography
Upp till kamp (2007)
Not like Others (2008)
Mellan oss (2008)
Sommaren med Göran (2009)
Johan Falk: Vapenbröder (2009)
Johan Falk - Gruppen för särskilda insatser (2009)
Johan Falk - National Target (2009)
Wallander - arvet (2010)
Kyss mig (2011)
Johan Falk: Spelets regler (2012)
Johan Falk: Organizatsija Karayan (2012)
Johan Falk: De 107 patrioterna (2012)
Johan Falk - Barninfiltratören (2012)
Annika Bengtzon: En plats i solen (2012)
Call Girl (2012)
Johan Falk - kodnamn: Lisa (2013)
Gentlemen (2014)
The Circle (2015)
Ares (2016)

References

External links

 

Swedish film actresses
1977 births
Living people
Swedish television actresses
21st-century Swedish actresses
Balettakademien